The women's 5 kilometre classical at the 2017 Asian Winter Games was held on 23 February 2017 at the Shirahatayama Open Stadium in Sapporo, Japan.

Schedule
All times are Japan Standard Time (UTC+09:00)

Results
Legend
DNF — Did not finish
DNS — Did not start

References

External links
Results at FIS website

Women 5